Hampton School (formerly Hampton Grammar School) is an independent boys' day school in Hampton, Greater London, England. It is regarded as one of the top independent schools in the country. Hampton School's A-Level and GCSE results in 2021 placed it at top 14 of all independent schools in the UK with 92% of boys achieving A*/A at A-Level - an improvement from top 20 with 73% of boys achieving A*/A in 2017

History
In 1557, Robert Hammond, a wealthy brewer who had acquired property in Hampton, left in his will provision for the maintenance of a "free scole" and to build a small schoolhouse "with seates in yt" in the churchyard of Hampton Church.

Although Hampton School was founded in 1557, there was provision in the will that the school would only continue as long as the vicar, churchwardens and parishioners carried out his requests. If not, then the properties would revert to his heirs. It seems that the school did not survive beyond 1568, or possibly earlier, and the properties reverted to the heirs.

Subsequently, however, the school re-opened in 1612. This was as a result of a commission established to enquire into the fate of Tudor charities that had disappeared for various reasons. The "learned counsell on bothe sides" reached deadlock at the commissioners. However, in the spirit of compromise and through the generosity of the then legal owner of the properties, Nicholas Pigeon, the school was re-endowed.

The early school was on the site of St Mary's Church by the River Thames. It moved to a site on Upper Sunbury Road in 1880. The new school buildings cost £8,000 and were built in the Elizabethan Tudor style to accommodate 125 day boys and 25 boarders. The school moved to its present site on Hanworth Road in 1939. The new 28-acre site allowed for expansion and the potential to provide for 600–650 boys. The foundation stone was laid on 5 July 1938 and a year later the school was opened. 

The school converted from voluntary aided status to become a fee-paying independent school in 1975 after changes to the administration of secondary education in the London Borough of Richmond upon Thames. It is next to The Lady Eleanor Holles School for girls, with which it co-operates in a number of co-curricular activities and shares several classes, clubs, facilities (including a swimming pool) and a coach service. Headmaster Barry Martin retired in July 2013 after 16 years of service. He was succeeded by Kevin Knibbs in September  2013.

Founders' Day is celebrated by the school towards the end of each academic year. The occasion is marked by a procession of boys walking from the school to St. Mary's Church for a service including the school choir singing and readings.

Old Hamptonians

in alphabetical order

 Simon Amor (1992–97), captain, England Sevens, 2003
 Zafar Ansari (2005–10), Surrey and England cricketer
 Kenneth Baker, Baron Baker of Dorking, CH (1946–48), former Home Secretary and Secretary of State for Education
 Andy Beattie, rugby player
 Paul Brand, Professor of Legal History at the University of Oxford
 Vic Briggs, musician (Brian Auger and The Trinity; Eric Burdon & The Animals)
 Paul Casey (1989–95), professional golfer (currently winner of 13 European Tour Events)
 Monty Munford (1972–79), Bollywood actor and writer for The Economist, Forbes and The Telegraph
 Jim Chandler (1935–42) represented Britain at pistol shooting in the [1948 Olympics]
 Thurston Dart (1933–38) musicologist and harpsichordist
 Keith Faulkner CBE (1955–62), chairman, Working Links, Manpower
 Tom Gearing (2003–2006), finalist of the Apprentice
 Walter Hayes, Sunday Dispatch editor, senior executive at the Ford Motor Company
 Murray Head (1959–62), musician
 Geoff Hunt (1959–66), former president of the Royal Society of Marine Artists 
 Tony James, pop musician
 Max Kretzschmar (2007–2010), footballer at Wycombe Wanderers FC
Louis Lynagh (2012-2019), rugby player at Harlequin FC
 Peter Lovesey (1948–55), author
 Justin Hulford (1982–89), author
 Chris Martin, Ocean rowing oarsman
 Sir Brian May, CBE (1958–65), musician (Queen)
 Jim McCarty, (1955–62) founding member of The Yardbirds
 Zach Miles (1964–71), chairman, Vedior
 Matt Brittin (1979–86), CEO of Google UK
 Iain Morris, (1984–91) co-writer of E4's The Inbetweeners
 Daniel Pemberton, (1989–96) composer 
 Toby Roland-Jones (1999–2006), Cricketer, Middlesex and England
 Paul Samwell-Smith (1955–62) founding member of The Yardbirds
 John Scott CBE FBA (1960–1968) sociologist and former pro vice-chancellor, Plymouth University
 Greg Searle, OBE (1983–90), Olympic gold-winning oarsman
 Jonny Searle, OBE (1980–87), Olympic gold-winning oarsman
 Barry Sheerman (1951–57), Labour MP for Huddersfield since 1983 and chairman of the Education Select Committee
 Graham Skinner, Air Vice Marshal (retd) CBE (1956–63)
 Ollie Stanhope MBE, Paralympic gold-winning oarsman
 Professor Michael Sterling (1957–64) vice chancellor, University of Birmingham; chairman of the Russell Group
 Dave Travis (1957–1964) UK international athlete, former UK record holder at javelin
 Dr. Michael Underwood (1737–1820), surgeon and writer on surgery, discoverer of infantile paralysis
 Air Marshal Sir Peter Wykeham-Barnes, KCB, DSO and Bar, DFC and Bar, AFC (1926–28)

Notable teachers past and present
 Martin Cross – Olympic rowing gold medallist Rowing at the 1984 Summer Olympics
 Maurice Xiberras – Last leader of the Integration with Britain Party (IWBP) in Gibraltar
 Andy Beattie – former rugby union player for Exeter Chiefs and Bath Rugby and current coach of the school's 1XV team.

Sources
Wild, Edward & Rice, Ken (2005) School by the Thames. Frome: Butler and Tanner Ltd (Ken Rice retired from teaching history at Hampton in 2007)
Hampton School Book

References

External links
 School website
 School Results

Educational institutions established in the 1550s
Private boys' schools in London
1557 establishments in England
Member schools of the Headmasters' and Headmistresses' Conference
 
Private schools in the London Borough of Richmond upon Thames
Hampton, London